My Singing Monsters is a 2012 video game franchise developed by Big Blue Bubble and published by Canada Media Fund. The first game of the series was released on September 4, 2012, for Apple iOS. Ports of the game for other operating systems were later released, including versions for Android, Amazon Kindle Fire, Barnes & Noble Nook, and Steam. The game was also released on the PlayStation Vita portable console. Since its release, My Singing Monsters has grown into a multimedia franchise, with a prequel, several spin-off games, books, live events and series, and a board game. On May 12, 2021, Big Blue Bubble announced that the series would be releasing its first console title, My Singing Monsters: Playground, on November 9, 2021.

My Singing Monsters

In My Singing Monsters, players collect and breed many different types of Monsters, each of which has a unique musical line that is either sung or played on an instrument. Breeding two elements of Monsters will create a new Monster species, which depends on what levels the breeding Monsters are. Each island possesses a unique set of available Monsters that together play a certain musical theme. Monsters that are present on an island will generate various types of in-game currency which can, in turn, be used to acquire decorations, remove obstacles, build structures, undo the removal of obstacles, and buy food for the Monsters to level up and generate more currency. There are also achievements and goals to direct gameplay, with in-game currency as rewards. It is also possible to buy currency such as Coins, Diamonds, Treats, Relics, Keys, or Shards. Certain currencies may be obtained using additional features.

Islands are the various places that monsters inhabit. Some islands follow the method of buying four single elements, then breeding those into even more monsters (i.e. Plant Island, Cold Island, Air Island). Other islands require teleporting monsters from another island (i.e. Ethereal Island, Magical Sanctum, Seasonal Shanty). Other islands have the player buy the monsters as "statues" or "vessels", then zap monster eggs from breeding structures on other islands into one of the statues to wake up the statue (i.e. Wublin Island, Celestial Island, Amber Island). The Colossingum is a combat island where the player can do quests to level up their Colossingum level. Players are also able to collect Costumes in The Colossingum. Composer Island is where players can create their own songs.

The distinction of My Singing Monsters from other simulation games is the "building" process of making music that is primarily driven by the use of the eponymous musical monsters. Players make their own decisions on what determines the "perfect" island by selectively picking monsters that they determine would improve their game overall through a combination of design and in-game currency generation. Some special monsters or decorations are more difficult to unlock, often requiring exclusive currencies, special events (such as holidays and in-game events), "Wishing Torches", or other special methods in order to obtain or activate them.

Some Monsters sing in nonsensical gibberish (such as the Mammott (bum), Fwog, (wow), and Toe Jammer (doo)), some sing fractured or short lines in English (such as the PomPom (hey), shugabush (yeah), and Hoola (yay)), and others play real-world or fictional instruments (such as the Shellbeat (drums) and Bowgart (cello)). There are also special Monsters known as "Werdos" that sing lyrics (the Parlsona, Tawkerr, Stoowarb, and Maggpi). The characters are often designed as exaggerations of real-world animals or objects (such as the common Fwog (frog) and T-Rox (T-rex)), cartoon caricatures of monsters from folklore and mythology (such as the Epic Blabbit (jackalope) and Dragong (dragon)), fusions of living creatures and instruments (such as Floogull (trumpet/seagull) and Sox (saxophone/fox), resemblances to real-world people (such as the Shugabush and G'joob), or representations of the monster's in-game elemental makeup (such as Clackula and Potbelly). Some monsters work differently, for example, the Wubbox is hatched in a box form, and must have all Natural Monsters on the island "boxed" into it to power it up (Rare and Epic Wubbox take Rares and Epics instead, as well as make different noises) Most Monsters have "Rare" and "Epic" variants, which are only available to obtain during special events.

In addition, other features such as the top islands, Tribal Island, achievements, friends, battles, and special events are also present.

Certain gameplay mechanics have been discontinued, such as the Mine, which was replaced with a Mini Mine, and a Maximum Mine on Plant Island if the player had made at least one in-app purchase.

Monster Choir 
Monster Choir was the Chinese and Korean version of My Singing Monsters published by Yodo1, which has since been discontinued. It features additional gameplay modes and functions.

My Singing Monsters: Dawn of Fire
My Singing Monsters: Dawn of Fire is a prequel of the original My Singing Monsters, set in a time when the element of Fire was born. Unlike the original game, the main song is on "Continent", a supercontinent land that was formed similarly to Pangaea. There are five sections of the continent, unlocked at different player levels and based on the Natural Islands from the original game. Monsters in their toddler form are initially raised on Continent, each of which plays a unique tune that contributes to the musical theme. Each monster requests a unique set of "crafting items" that can be used to increase their level up to level 20; filling these requests will reward in-game currency plus additional benefits that can unlock additional features of the game. At a certain monster level, unique to each monster, toddler monsters are able to permanently teleport to additional islands known as "Outer Islands" as adult monsters, gaining new musical lines on an island with a unique group of musical monsters that produce an entirely different song theme. These include Party Island, Space Island, Cloud Island, and Cave Island. There is also one other island, called Starhenge, which is the original version of Celestial Island from the original game. Dawn of Fire also introduced Prismatics, which are only available during certain events, and during those events can be created by sending a monster through the Prism Gate. Prismatics serve as the prequel's equivalent of Rare and Epic monsters from the original game.

Other games

My Singing Monsters: Composer 
My Singing Monsters: Composer serves as an app to compose custom songs using some, but not all, monsters from the franchise.

My Singing Monsters: Playground 
My Singing Monsters: Playground is a party video game. In My Singing Monsters: Playground, players can compete in games that are set in the Monster World and can play as characters from the My Singing Monsters franchise. My Singing Monsters: Playground also has a physical version that is exclusive to the Nintendo Switch, that released on November 9, 2021.

My Singing Monsters: The Board Game 
My Singing Monsters: The Board Game is a board game based on the My Singing Monsters franchise. The board game was supported by Kickstarter from June 1 to 21 and is designed by Sen-Foong Lim and Jay Cormier. There are two versions of the game; the Standard Edition, which includes all of the core components, and the Deluxe Edition, which includes nine painted Monster mini-figures, upgraded components, and an exclusive expansion that features the Werdo monsters. The board game is a worker placement game, in which the player breeds Monsters to produce more coins than other players.

Teaching Guide Grade 1-3: My Singing Monsters 
In 2018, Big Blue Bubble released an educational guide aimed towards elementary school children; Teaching Guide Grade 1-3: My Singing Monsters, which was intended to teach lessons about music using characters and concepts from the franchise.

Discontinued Games

Furcorn's Jelly Dreams/Jammer Splash 
Furcorn's Jelly Dreams was a puzzle game featuring characters from the franchise, and was discontinued in 2017. This eventually was remade into Jammer Splash!, which was also discontinued as well.

Other discontinued games 
Several other games from the franchise have also been discontinued, including My Mammott, My PomPom, Fling a Thing!, Thumpies, My Singing Monsters: Coloring Book, and My Singing Monsters: Official Guide. Fling a Thing! and Thumpies were released prior to My Singing Monsters, and references to these games can be found throughout the My Singing Monsters series.

Notable collaborations 
On June 17, 2013, Big Blue Bubble collaborated with Disney Mobile to make My Muppets Show, a game featuring similar gameplay to My Singing Monsters, albeit with Muppets instead. The game featured five stages, each with its own song, and Muppets were obtained by "digitizing" them with a machine called HARV-E. The game was permanently discontinued on January 9, 2015.

In July 2013, Big Blue Bubble announced that they had collaborated with Grammy Award-winning artist Kristian Bush from American country music duo Sugarland to create a new monster, the Shugabush. Bush had been inspired to collaborate with My Singing Monsters upon seeing his 11-year-old son playing the game. His cousin, Charles Moser, was a Big Blue Bubble intern at the time, so he immediately called him.  He praised the attractive music surrounding the game, and collaborated with Big Blue Bubble to create the Shugabush. After his collaboration was featured in a news release, he had said "First of all, the music in My Singing Monsters is irresistible — that's what drew me to the game. And since I love to dream big via social media, I'm so glad that Dave Kerr and his team at My Singing Monsters dreamed back. I've always wanted to let my inner monster out [...] and I think I'm finally about to impress my son."

In October 2013 Big Blue Bubble signed a deal with publishing house Egmont UK as its new strategic licensing partner.

In July 2017 Big Blue Bubble announced that Wind Sun Sky Entertainment will adapt its mobile game My Singing Monsters into a multi-media franchise, beginning with an animated TV series and consumer products program. Skybound Entertainment will be the distributor in all territories worldwide, excluding Canada.

In 2021, Big Blue Bubble began a 7-episode series called "My Singing Monsters: Fandemonium", in collaboration with Wind Sun Sky Entertainment. The series aired exclusively on YouTube. The show was hosted by Mammott, Furcorn, and PomPom. It discussed future updates in the franchise, as well as answered community questions, and other sorts of entertainment. My Singing Monsters: Fandemonium is separate from the TV show.

Reception

Kotaku described the original My Singing Monsters as a "clever combination of music and monster breeding", praising how the complexity of a song can become developed by the utility of breeding monsters, each monster revealing a new line to the song. However, Kotaku was "a bit disappointed" with the level of complexity added in Dawn of Fire, reporting that the new feeding system hinders progress towards the whole concept of unveiling the "musical nirvana".

Gamezebo and 148Apps enjoy the music in My Singing Monsters, but were not pleased with the connection issues.

The game won the People's Voice Award for "Best Music/Sound Design" at the 2020 Webby Awards.

References

External links
My Singing Monsters official website

2012 video games
IOS games
Android (operating system) games
PlayStation Vita games
Simulation video games
Video games developed in Canada
Video game franchises introduced in 2012
Video game franchises
Music video games
Big Blue Bubble games